Codium galeatum is a species of seaweed in the Codiaceae family.

In Western Australia it is found along the coast in Mid West, extending down to the southern coast. It extends as far as Ballina in New South Wales and is found along Tasmanian coasts.

References

galeatum
Plants described in 1887